Paolo Truzzu (born 25 July 1972) is an Italian politician, Mayor of Cagliari elected on 17 June 2019.

References 

1972 births
Living people
21st-century Italian politicians
Mayors of Cagliari
People from Cagliari